Ilyas Gull  (born 1 January 1968) is a Pakistani-born Hong Kong cricketer. He was named captain of the Hong Kong cricket team for the 2007 ICC World Cricket League Division Three tournament, when Tim Smart resigned the captaincy.

Gull was born on 1 January 1968, in Rawalpindi, Pakistan.

His best One Day International bowling performance is 3–46 against Bangladesh at Colombo in 2004; as of 2007, he remains the only Hong Kong player to take three wickets in an ODI. In first-class cricket, he took 5-16 for Hong Kong against the UAE at Sharjah in the 2005 ICC Intercontinental Cup.

References

External links
 

Hong Kong One Day International cricketers
Hong Kong cricketers
1968 births
Living people
Cricketers at the 2010 Asian Games
Pakistani emigrants to Hong Kong
Cricketers from Rawalpindi
Asian Games competitors for Hong Kong